is a 2005 Japanese anime television series with 12 episodes by Trinet Entertainment and Studio Kuma, which is the sequel to the hentai OVA Izumo. It is based on the eroge Izumo 2 developed by Studio E-Go!.

The anime is licensed by Discotek Media and was released on DVD in February 2017.

Story 
Yagi Takeru has been living in the Tōma family's house since his parents are gone. He was raised by Tōma Rokunosuke, the head of the house. He is surrounded by many people such as Yamato Takeshi, his best friend/rival from the kendo club, the Shiratori sisters, Kotono and Asuka, and his childhood friend, Osu Seri. Life has been blissful until one day, an earthquake strikes the school and everything changes. Takeru awakens to find that the school looks as if it has been abandoned for centuries and reduced to ruins. He also realize that all the teachers and students have disappeared as well. He meets up with Seri and Asuka and they fled from the ruins, only to realize that the town they used to live in is completely empty. Subsequently, people wrapped in cloaks appear before him. They were told that they have been brought to another world.
Takeru had been given the duty to intercourse the princess of this world and give birth to the warrior who will eventually change the world

Character

Episode list
1. Call in a Dream
2. Strange World
3. Separated Friends
4. Form of this World
5. The Attack
6. Four Heavenly Beasts
7. Fortress of the Duel
8. A Peaceful Moment
9. Returning
10. Yomotsuhirasaka
11. Raging Life
12. Two Souls

Theme songs
 Opening theme: Romantic Chaser by Sae
 Ending theme:  by Clover

References

External links 
 
 

Anime series
Discotek Media

de:Izumo (Computerspiel)#Izumo: Takeki Tsurugi no Senki